The 1978–79 Seattle SuperSonics season was the team's 12th since the franchise began, and their most successful, winning their only NBA title.

In the playoffs, the SuperSonics defeated the Los Angeles Lakers in five games in the Semi-finals, then defeated the Phoenix Suns in seven games in the Conference Finals to reach the NBA Finals for a second consecutive season in a rematch of the 1978 NBA Finals, facing the defending NBA champion Washington Bullets whom they had lost to in seven games. The Sonics would go on to avenge their NBA Finals loss and defeat the Bullets in five games, winning their first and only NBA championship. Dennis Johnson was named the NBA Finals MVP.

They wouldn't reach another NBA Finals Until 1996 in which they were led by Gary Payton and Shawn Kemp.

This was Seattle's first professional sports championship since the Seattle Metropolitans victory in the Stanley Cup in 1917.

Draft picks

Roster

Regular season

Season standings

Record vs. opponents

Game log

Playoffs
The SuperSonics had a first round bye, then defeated the Los Angeles Lakers in the Western Conference Semi-finals, the Phoenix Suns in the Western Conference Finals, and the Washington Bullets in the NBA Finals. Dennis Johnson of the SuperSonics was the Most Valuable Player of the Finals while teammate Gus Williams was the leading scorer, averaging 28.6 points per game.

Game log

|- align="center" bgcolor="#ccffcc"
| 1
| April 17
| Los Angeles
| W 112–101
| Dennis Johnson (26)
| Lonnie Shelton (12)
| John Johnson (9)
| Kingdome26,377
| 1–0
|- align="center" bgcolor="#ccffcc"
| 2
| April 18
| Los Angeles
| W 108–103 (OT)
| Gus Williams (38)
| Jack Sikma (10)
| Jack Sikma (8)
| Kingdome26,862
| 2–0
|- align="center" bgcolor="#ffcccc"
| 3
| April 20
| @ Los Angeles
| L 112–118 (OT)
| Gus Williams (29)
| Paul Silas (13)
| Paul Silas (4)
| The Forum17,505
| 2–1
|- align="center" bgcolor="#ccffcc"
| 4
| April 22
| @ Los Angeles
| W 117–115
| Gus Williams (30)
| D. Johnson, Sikma (11)
| Dennis Johnson (7)
| The Forum17,505
| 3–1
|- align="center" bgcolor="#ccffcc"
| 5
| April 25
| Los Angeles
| W 106–100
| Gus Williams (30)
| Jack Sikma (10)
| Jack Sikma (6)
| Seattle Center Coliseum14,098
| 4–1

|- align="center" bgcolor="#ccffcc"
| 1
| May 1
| Phoenix
| W 108–93
| Gus Williams (27)
| Jack Sikma (10)
| John Johnson (9)
| Seattle Center Coliseum14,098
| 1–0
|- align="center" bgcolor="#ccffcc"
| 2
| May 4
| Phoenix
| W 103–97
| John Johnson (21)
| Lonnie Shelton (15)
| Gus Williams (6)
| Kingdome31,964
| 2–0
|- align="center" bgcolor="#ffcccc"
| 3
| May 6
| @ Phoenix
| L 103–113
| Gus Williams (22)
| J. Johnson, Sikma (9)
| Gus Williams (6)
| Arizona Veterans Memorial Coliseum12,660
| 2–1
|- align="center" bgcolor="#ffcccc"
| 4
| May 8
| @ Phoenix
| L 100–91
| Gus Williams (22)
| Lonnie Shelton (10)
| three players tied (3)
| Arizona Veterans Memorial Coliseum12,660
| 2–2
|- align="center" bgcolor="#ffcccc"
| 5
| May 11
| Phoenix
| L 93–99
| Dennis Johnson (24)
| Jack Sikma (12)
| John Johnson (5)
| Kingdome28,935
| 2–3
|- align="center" bgcolor="#ccffcc"
| 6
| May 13
| @ Phoenix
| W 106–105
| Dennis Johnson (23)
| Jack Sikma (10)
| Dennis Johnson (6)
| Arizona Veterans Memorial Coliseum12,660
| 3–3
|- align="center" bgcolor="#ccffcc"
| 7
| May 17
| Phoenix
| W 114–110
| Jack Sikma (33)
| Jack Sikma (11)
| Fred Brown (5)
| Kingdome37,552
| 4–3

|- align="center" bgcolor="#ffcccc"
| 1
| May 20
| @ Washington
| L 97–99
| Gus Williams (32)
| John Johnson (11)
| Dennis Johnson (7)
| Capital Centre19,035
| 0–1
|- align="center" bgcolor="#ccffcc"
| 2
| May 24
| @ Washington
| W 92–82
| Gus Williams (23)
| Jack Sikma (13)
| D. Johnson, J. Johnson (6)
| Capital Centre19,035
| 1–1
|- align="center" bgcolor="#ccffcc"
| 3
| May 27
| Washington
| W 105–95
| Gus Williams (31)
| Jack Sikma (17)
| Dennis Johnson (9)
| Kingdome 35,928
| 2–1
|- align="center" bgcolor="#ccffcc"
| 4
| May 29
| Washington
| W 114–112 (OT)
| Gus Williams (36)
| Jack Sikma (17)
| John Johnson (13)
| Seattle Center Coliseum14,098
| 3–1
|- align="center" bgcolor="#ccffcc"
| 5
| June 1
| @ Washington
| W 97–93
| Gus Williams (23)
| Jack Sikma (17)
| John Johnson (6)
| Capital Centre19,035
| 4–1

Awards and records
 Dennis Johnson, NBA All-Defensive First Team
 Dennis Johnson, NBA Finals Most Valuable Player

References

 SuperSonics on Database Basketball
 SuperSonics on Basketball Reference

External links
 Seattle PI: Photos | 1979 National Champion Seattle SuperSonics

Seattle
Seattle SuperSonics seasons
NBA championship seasons
Western Conference (NBA) championship seasons